Angel Mulu (born 21 November 1999) is a New Zealand rugby union player.

Biography 
Mulu attended Tauranga Girls' College. She plays for the Bay of Plenty Volcanix, she made her debut for them in 2018.

In 2019 Mulu featured for Black Ferns Development team at the Oceania Rugby Women's Championship in Fiji.

Mulu played for the Chiefs in the inaugural season of Super Rugby Aupiki. She made history when she scored the competitions first-ever try against Matatū.

Mulu was named in the Black Ferns squad for the 2022 Pacific Four Series. She made her international debut on 6 June against Australia at Tauranga at the Pacific Four Series.

References

External links 

 Black Ferns Profile
 Chiefs Profile

1999 births
Living people
New Zealand female rugby union players
New Zealand women's international rugby union players
Rugby union props
People educated at Tauranga Girls' College